The Bank of England is the central bank of the United Kingdom and the model on which most modern central banks have been based. Established in 1694 to act as the English Government's banker, and still one of the bankers for the Government of the United Kingdom, it is the world's eighth-oldest bank. It was privately owned by stockholders from its foundation in 1694 until it was nationalised in 1946 by the Attlee ministry.

The bank became an independent public organisation in 1998, wholly owned by the Treasury Solicitor on behalf of the government, with a mandate to support the economic policies of the government of the day, but independence in maintaining price stability.

The bank is one of eight banks authorised to issue banknotes in the United Kingdom, has a monopoly on the issue of banknotes in England and Wales, and regulates the issue of banknotes by commercial banks in Scotland and Northern Ireland.

The bank's Monetary Policy Committee has devolved responsibility for managing monetary policy. The Treasury has reserve powers to give orders to the committee "if they are required in the public interest and by extreme economic circumstances", but Parliament must endorse such orders within 28 days. In addition, the bank's Financial Policy Committee was set up in 2011 as a macroprudential regulator to oversee the UK's financial sector.

The bank's headquarters have been in London's main financial district, the City of London, on Threadneedle Street, since 1734. It is sometimes known as The Old Lady of Threadneedle Street a name taken from a satirical cartoon by James Gillray in 1797. The road junction outside is known as Bank Junction.

As a regulator and central bank, the Bank of England has not offered consumer banking services for many years, but it still does manage some public-facing services, such as exchanging superseded bank notes. Until 2016, the bank provided personal banking services as a privilege for employees.

History

Founding

England's crushing defeat by France, the dominant naval power, in naval engagements culminating in the 1690 Battle of Beachy Head, became the catalyst for England to rebuild itself as a global power. William III's government wanted to build a naval fleet that would rival that of France; however, the ability to construct this fleet was hampered both by a lack of available public funds and the low credit of the English government in London. This lack of credit made it impossible for the English government to borrow the £1,200,000 (at 8% per annum) that it wanted to construct the fleet.

To induce subscription to the loan, the subscribers were to be incorporated by the name of the Governor and Company of the Bank of England. The bank was given exclusive possession of the government's balances and was the only limited-liability corporation allowed to issue bank notes. The lenders would give the government cash (bullion) and issue notes against the government bonds, which could be lent again. The £1.2 million was raised in 12 days; half of this was used to rebuild the navy.

As a side effect, the huge industrial effort needed, including establishing ironworks to make more nails and advances in agriculture feeding the quadrupled strength of the navy, started to transform the economy. This helped the new Kingdom of Great Britain – England and Scotland were formally united in 1707 – to become powerful. The power of the navy made Britain the dominant world power in the late 18th and early 19th centuries.

The establishment of the bank was devised by Charles Montagu, 1st Earl of Halifax, in 1694. The plan of 1691, which had been proposed by William Paterson three years before, had not then been acted upon. Fifty-eight years earlier, in 1636, Financier to the king, Philip Burlamachi, had proposed exactly the same idea in a letter addressed to Francis Windebank. He proposed a loan of £1.2 million to the government; in return the subscribers would be incorporated as The Governor and Company of the Bank of England with long-term banking privileges including the issue of notes.

The royal charter was granted on 27 July through the passage of the Tonnage Act 1694. Public finances were in such dire condition at the time that the terms of the loan were that it was to be serviced at a rate of 8% per annum, and there was also a service charge of £4,000 per annum for the management of the loan. The first governor was John Houblon (who was later depicted on a £50 note). 

The bank initially did not have its own building, first opening on 1 August 1694 in Mercers' Hall on Cheapside. This however was found to be too small and from 31 December 1694 the bank operated from Grocers' Hall, located then on Poultry, where it would remain for almost 40 years.

18th century

In 1700, the Hollow Sword Blade Company was purchased by a group of businessmen who wished to establish a competing English bank (in an action that would today be considered a "back door listing"). The Bank of England's initial monopoly on English banking was due to expire in 1710. However, it was instead renewed, and the Sword Blade company failed to achieve its goal.

The South Sea Company was established in 1711. In 1720 it became responsible for part of the UK's national debt, becoming a major competitor to the Bank of England. While the "South Sea Bubble" disaster soon ensued, the company continued managing part of the UK national debt until 1853.

The Bank of England moved to its current location in Threadneedle Street in 1734 and thereafter slowly acquired neighbouring land to create the site necessary for erecting the bank's original home at this location, under the direction of its chief architect John Soane, between 1790 and 1827. (Herbert Baker's rebuilding of the bank in the first half of the 20th century, demolishing most of Soane's masterpiece, was described by architectural historian Nikolaus Pevsner as "the greatest architectural crime, in the City of London, of the twentieth century".)

The bank's charter was again renewed in 1742 and 1764.

The Credit crisis of 1772 has been described as the first modern banking crisis faced by the Bank of England. The whole City of London was in uproar when Alexander Fordyce was declared bankrupt. In August 1773, the Bank of England assisted the EIC with a loan. The strain upon the reserves of the Bank of England was not eased until towards the end of the year.

When the idea and reality of the national debt came about during the 18th century, this was also largely managed by the bank. 

During the American War of Independence, business for the bank was so good that George Washington remained a shareholder throughout the period. 

By the bank's charter renewal in 1781, it was also the bankers' bank – keeping enough gold to pay its notes on demand until 26 February 1797 when war had so diminished gold reserves that – following an invasion scare caused by the Battle of Fishguard days earlier – the government prohibited the bank from paying out in gold by the passing of the bank Restriction Act 1797. This prohibition lasted until 1821.

19th century

In 1825–26 the bank was able to avert a liquidity crisis when Nathan Mayer Rothschild succeeded in supplying it with gold.

The Bank Charter Act 1844 tied the issue of notes to the gold reserves and gave the bank sole rights with regard to the issue of banknotes in England. Private banks that had previously had that right retained it, provided that their headquarters were outside London and that they deposited security against the notes that they issued.

The bank acted as lender of last resort for the first time in the panic of 1866.

20th century
The last private bank in England to issue its own notes was Thomas Fox's Fox, Fowler and Company bank in Wellington, which rapidly expanded until it merged with Lloyds Bank in 1927. They were legal tender until 1964. There are nine notes left in circulation; one is housed at Tone Dale House, Wellington. (Scottish and Northern Irish private banks continue to issue notes regulated by the bank.)

Britain was on the gold standard, meaning the value of sterling was fixed by the price of gold, until 1931 when the Bank of England had to take Britain off the gold standard due to the effects of Great Depression spreading to Europe.

During the governorship of Montagu Norman, from 1920 to 1944, the bank made deliberate efforts to move away from commercial banking and become a central bank.

During WWII, over 10% of the face value of circulating Pound Sterling banknotes were forgeries produced by Germany.

In 1946, shortly after the end of Montagu Norman's tenure, the bank was nationalised by the Labour government.

The bank pursued the multiple goals of Keynesian economics after 1945, especially "easy money" and low-interest rates to support aggregate demand. It tried to keep a fixed exchange rate and attempted to deal with inflation and sterling weakness by credit and exchange controls.

The bank's "10 bob note" was withdrawn from circulation in 1970 in preparation for Decimal Day in 1971.

In 1977 the Bank set up a wholly owned subsidiary called Bank of England Nominees Limited (BOEN), a now-defunct private limited company, with two of its hundred £1 shares issued. According to its memorandum of association, its objectives were: "To act as Nominee or agent or attorney either solely or jointly with others, for any person or persons, partnership, company, corporation, government, state, organisation, sovereign, province, authority, or public body, or any group or association of them". Bank of England Nominees Limited was granted an exemption by Edmund Dell, Secretary of State for Trade, from the disclosure requirements under Section 27(9) of the Companies Act 1976, because "it was considered undesirable that the disclosure requirements should apply to certain categories of shareholders". The Bank of England is also protected by its royal charter status and the Official Secrets Act. BOEN was a vehicle for governments and heads of state to invest in UK companies (subject to approval from the Secretary of State), providing they undertake "not to influence the affairs of the company". In its later years, BOEN was no longer exempt from company law disclosure requirements. Although a dormant company, dormancy does not preclude a company actively operating as a nominee shareholder. BOEN had two shareholders: the Bank of England, and the Secretary of the Bank of England.

The reserve requirement for banks to hold a minimum fixed proportion of their deposits as reserves at the Bank of England was abolished in 1981: see  for more details. The contemporary transition from Keynesian economics to Chicago economics was analysed by Nicholas Kaldor in The Scourge of Monetarism.

The handing over of monetary policy to the bank became a key plank of the Liberal Democrats' economic policy for the 1992 general election. Conservative MP Nicholas Budgen had also proposed this as a private member's bill in 1996, but the bill failed as it had the support of neither the government nor the opposition.

The UK government left the expensive-to-maintain European Exchange Rate Mechanism in September 1992, in an action that cost HM Treasury over £3 billion. This led to closer communication between the government and the bank.

In 1993, the bank produced its first Inflation Report for the government, detailing inflationary trends and pressures. This annually produced report remains one of the bank's major publications. The success of inflation targeting in the United Kingdom has been attributed to the bank's focus on transparency. The Bank of England has been a leader in producing innovative ways of communicating information to the public, especially through its Inflation Report, which many other central banks have emulated.

The bank celebrated its three-hundredth birthday in 1994.

In 1996, the bank produced its first Financial Stability Review. This annual publication became known as the Financial Stability Report in 2006. Also that year, the bank set up its real-time gross settlement (RTGS) system to improve risk-free settlement between UK banks.

On 6 May 1997, following the 1997 general election that brought a Labour government to power for the first time since 1979, it was announced by the Chancellor of the Exchequer, Gordon Brown, that the bank would be granted operational independence over monetary policy. Under the terms of the Bank of England Act 1998 (which came into force on 1 June 1998) the bank's Monetary Policy Committee (MPC) was given sole responsibility for setting interest rates to meet the Government's Retail Prices Index (RPI) inflation target of 2.5%. The target has changed to 2% since the Consumer Price Index (CPI) replaced the Retail Prices Index as the Treasury's inflation index. If inflation overshoots or undershoots the target by more than 1% the Governor has to write a letter to the Chancellor of the Exchequer explaining why, and how he will remedy the situation.

Independent central banks that adopt an inflation target are known as Friedmanite central banks. This change in Labour's politics was described by Skidelsky in The Return of the Master as a mistake and as an adoption of the rational expectations hypothesis as promulgated by Alan Walters. Inflation targets combined with central bank independence have been characterised as a "starve the beast" strategy creating a lack of money in the public sector.

1913 attempted bombing
 

A terrorist bombing was attempted outside the Bank of England building on 4 April 1913. A bomb was discovered smoking and ready to explode next to railings outside the building. The bomb had been planted as part of the suffragette bombing and arson campaign, in which the Women's Social and Political Union (WSPU) launched a series of politically motivated bombing and arson attacks nationwide as part of their campaign for women's suffrage. The bomb was defused before it could detonate, in what was then one of the busiest public streets in the capital, which likely prevented many civilian casualties. The bomb had been planted the day after WSPU leader Emmeline Pankhurst was sentenced to three years' imprisonment for carrying out a bombing on the home of politician David Lloyd George.

The remains of the bomb, which was built into a milk churn, are now on display at the City of London Police Museum.

21st century

Mervyn King became the Governor of the Bank of England on 30 June 2003.

In 2009, a request made to HM Treasury under the Freedom of Information Act sought details about the 3% Bank of England stock owned by unnamed shareholders whose identity the bank is not at liberty to disclose. In a letter of reply dated 15 October 2009, HM Treasury explained that "Some of the 3% Treasury stock which was used to compensate former owners of Bank stock has not been redeemed. However, interest is paid out twice a year and it is not the case that this has been accumulating and compounding." 

The Financial Services Act 2012 gave the bank additional functions and bodies, including an independent Financial Policy Committee (FPC), the Prudential Regulation Authority (PRA), and more powers to supervise financial market infrastructure providers.

Canadian Mark Carney assumed the post of Governor of the Bank of England on 1 July 2013. He served an initial five-year term rather than the typical eight. He became the first Governor not to be a United Kingdom citizen but has since been granted citizenship. At Government request, his term was extended to 2019, then again to 2020. , the bank also had four Deputy Governors.

BOEN was dissolved, following liquidation, in July 2017.

Andrew Bailey succeeded Carney as the Governor of the Bank of England on 16 March 2020.

Functions 
Two main areas are tackled by the bank to ensure it carries out these functions efficiently:

Monetary stability

Stable prices and confidence in the currency are the two main criteria for monetary stability. Stable prices are maintained by seeking to ensure that price increases meet the Government's inflation target. The bank aims to meet this target by adjusting the base interest rate, which is decided by the Monetary Policy Committee, and through its communications strategy, such as publishing yield curves.

Maintaining financial stability involves protecting against threats to the whole financial system. Threats are detected by the bank's surveillance and market intelligence functions. The threats are then dealt with through financial and other operations, both at home and abroad. In exceptional circumstances, the bank may act as the lender of last resort by extending credit when no other institution will.
The bank works together with other institutions to secure both monetary and financial stability, including:
 HM Treasury, the Government department responsible for financial and economic policy; and
 Other central banks and international organisations, with the aim of improving the international financial system.

The 1997 memorandum of understanding describes the terms under which the bank, the Treasury, and the FSA work toward the common aim of increased financial stability. In 2010, the incoming Chancellor announced his intention to merge the FSA back into the bank. As of 2012, the current director for financial stability is Andy Haldane.

The bank acts as the government's banker, and it maintains the government's Consolidated Fund account. It also manages the country's foreign exchange and gold reserves. The bank also acts as the bankers' bank, especially in its capacity as a lender of last resort.

The bank has a monopoly on the issue of banknotes in England and Wales. Scottish and Northern Irish banks retain the right to issue their own banknotes, but they must be backed one-for-one with deposits at the bank, excepting a few million pounds representing the value of notes they had in circulation in 1845. The bank decided to sell its banknote-printing operations to De La Rue in December 2002, under the advice of Close Brothers Corporate Finance Ltd.

Since 1998 the Monetary Policy Committee (MPC) has had the responsibility for setting the official interest rate. However, with the decision to grant the bank operational independence, responsibility for government debt management was transferred in 1998 to the new Debt Management Office, which also took over government cash management in 2000. Computershare took over as the registrar for UK Government bonds (gilt-edged securities or 'gilts') from the bank at the end of 2004.

The bank used to be responsible for the regulation and supervision of the banking and insurance industries. This responsibility was transferred to the Financial Services Authority in June 1998, but after the financial crises in 2008, new banking legislation transferred the responsibility for regulation and supervision of the banking and insurance industries back to the bank.

In 2011 the interim Financial Policy Committee (FPC) was created as a mirror committee to the MPC to spearhead the bank's new mandate on financial stability. The FPC is responsible for macro-prudential regulation of all UK banks and insurance companies.

To help maintain economic stability, the bank attempts to broaden understanding of its role, both through regular speeches and publications by senior Bank figures, a semiannual Financial Stability Report, and through a wider education strategy aimed at the general public. It currently maintains a free museum and ran the Target Two Point Zero competition for A-level students, closing in 2017.

Asset purchase facility 
The bank has operated, since January 2009, an Asset Purchase Facility (APF) to buy "high-quality assets financed by the issue of Treasury bills and the DMO's cash management operations" and thereby improve liquidity in the credit markets. It has, since March 2009, also provided the mechanism by which the bank's policy of quantitative easing (QE) is achieved, under the auspices of the MPC. Along with managing the QE funds, which were £895 bn at peak, the APF continues to operate its corporate facilities. Both are undertaken by a subsidiary company of the Bank of England, the Bank of England Asset Purchase Facility Fund Limited (BEAPFF).

QE was primarily designed as an instrument of monetary policy. The mechanism required the Bank of England to purchase government bonds on the secondary market, financed by creating new central bank money. This would have the effect of increasing the asset prices of the bonds purchased, thereby lowering yields and dampening longer-term interest rates. The policy's aim was initially to ease liquidity constraints in the sterling reserves system but evolved into a wider policy to provide economic stimulus.

QE was enacted in six tranches between 2009 and 2020. At its peak in 2020, the portfolio totalled £895 billion, comprising £875 billion of UK government bonds and £20 billion of high-grade commercial bonds.

In February 2022, the Bank of England announced its intention to commence winding down the QE portfolio. Initially this would be achieved by not replacing tranches of maturing bonds, and would later be accelerated through active bond sales.

In August 2022, the Bank of England reiterated its intention to accelerate the QE wind-down through active bond sales. This policy was affirmed in an exchange of letters between the Bank of England and the UK Chancellor of the Exchequer in September 2022. Between February 2022 and September 2022, a total of £37.1bn of government bonds matured, reducing the outstanding stock from £875.0bn at the end of 2021 to £837.9bn. In addition, a total of £1.1bn of corporate bonds matured, reducing the stock from £20.0bn to £18.9bn, with sales of the remaining stock planned to begin on 27 September.

Banknote issues

The bank has issued banknotes since 1694. Notes were originally hand-written; although they were partially printed from 1725 onwards, cashiers still had to sign each note and make them payable to someone. Notes were fully printed from 1855. Until 1928 all notes were "White Notes", printed in black and with a blank reverse. In the 18th and 19th centuries, White Notes were issued in £1 and £2 denominations. During the 20th century, White Notes were issued in denominations between £5 and £1000.

Until the mid-19th century, commercial banks were allowed to issue their own banknotes, and notes issued by provincial banking companies were commonly in circulation. The Bank Charter Act 1844 began the process of restricting note issue to the bank; new banks were prohibited from issuing their own banknotes, and existing note-issuing banks were not permitted to expand their issue. As provincial banking companies merged to form larger banks, they lost their right to issue notes, and the English private banknote eventually disappeared, leaving the bank with a monopoly of note issues in England and Wales. The last private bank to issue its own banknotes in England and Wales was Fox, Fowler and Company in 1921. However, the limitations of the 1844 Act only affected banks in England and Wales, and today three commercial banks in Scotland and four in Northern Ireland continue to issue their own banknotes, regulated by the bank.

At the start of the First World War, the Currency and Bank Notes Act 1914 was passed, which granted temporary powers to HM Treasury for issuing banknotes to the values of £1 and 10/- (ten shillings). Treasury notes had full legal tender status and were not convertible into gold through the bank; they replaced the gold coin in circulation to prevent a run on sterling and to enable raw material purchases for armament production. These notes featured an image of King George V (Bank of England notes did not begin to display an image of the monarch until 1960). The wording on each note was:

Treasury notes were issued until 1928 when the Currency and Bank Notes Act 1928 returned note-issuing powers to the banks. The Bank of England issued notes for ten shillings and one pound for the first time on 22 November 1928.

During the Second World War, the German Operation Bernhard attempted to counterfeit denominations between £5 and £50, producing 500,000 notes each month in 1943. The original plan was to parachute the money into the UK in an attempt to destabilise the British economy, but it was found more useful to use the notes to pay German agents operating throughout Europe. Although most fell into Allied hands at the end of the war, forgeries frequently appeared for years afterward, which led banknote denominations above £5 to be removed from circulation.

In 2006, over £53 million in banknotes belonging to the bank was stolen from a depot in Tonbridge, Kent.

Modern banknotes are printed by contract with De La Rue Currency in Loughton, Essex.

Gold vault
The bank is custodian to the official gold reserves of the United Kingdom and around 30 other countries. These estimates suggest that the vault could hold as much as 3% of the 171,300 tonnes of gold mined throughout human history.

Governance of the Bank of England

Governors

Following is a list of the governors of the Bank of England since the beginning of the 20th century:

Court of Directors
The Court of Directors is a unitary board that is responsible for setting the organisation's strategy and budget and making key decisions on resourcing and appointments. It consists of five executive members from the bank plus up to 9 non-executive members, all of whom are appointed by the Crown. The Chancellor selects the Chairman of the Court from among the non-executive members. The Court is required to meet at least seven times a year.

The Governor serves for a period of eight years, the Deputy Governors for five years, and the non-executive members for up to four years.

Other staff
Since 2013, the bank has had a chief operating officer (COO). , the bank's COO has been Joanna Place.

, the bank's chief economist is Huw Pill.

See also 

 List of British currencies
 Bank of England Act
 Bank of England club
 Coins of the pound sterling
 Financial Sanctions Unit
 Fractional-reserve banking
 Commonwealth banknote-issuing institutions
 Bank of England Museum
 Deputy Governor of the Bank of England
 List of directors of the Bank of England

Notes

References

Further reading
 , on nationalisation 1945–50, pp 43–76
 Capie, Forrest. The Bank of England: 1950s to 1979 (Cambridge University Press, 2010). xxviii + 890 pp.   excerpt and text search
 
 Fforde, John. The Role of the Bank of England, 1941–1958 (1992) excerpt and text search
 Francis, John. History of the Bank of England: Its Times and Traditions excerpt and text search
 Hennessy, Elizabeth. A Domestic History of the Bank of England, 1930–1960 (2008)  excerpt and text search
 Kynaston, David. 2017. Till Time's Last Sand: A History of the Bank of England, 1694–2013. Bloomsbury.
 Lane, Nicholas. "The Bank of England in the Nineteenth Century." History Today (Aug 1960) 19#8 pp 535–541. 
 O'Brien, Patrick K.; Palma, Nuno (2022). "Not an ordinary bank but a great engine of state: The Bank of England and the British economy, 1694–1844". The Economic History Review.
 Roberts, Richard, and David Kynaston. The Bank of England: Money, Power and Influence 1694–1994 (1995)
 Sayers, R. S. The Bank of England, 1891–1944 (1986)  excerpt and text search
 Schuster, F. The Bank of England and the State
 Wood, John H. A History of Central Banking in Great Britain and the United States (Cambridge University Press, 2005)

External links

 

 
1694 establishments in England
England
Banks established in 1694
 
Grade I listed buildings in the City of London
England
Economy of the United Kingdom
HM Treasury
Organisations based in London with royal patronage
Organisations based in the City of London
Public corporations of the United Kingdom with a Royal Charter
Herbert Baker buildings and structures
John Soane buildings
Georgian architecture in London
Neoclassical architecture in London
Grade I listed banks
Leeds Blue Plaques